Lake Cairlocup is an ephemeral salt lake in the Great Southern region of Western Australia, approximately  north-west of Jerramungup and  south-east of Lake Grace. 

Fringing vegetation around the lake includes Hakea brachyptera, Lechenaultia acutiloba, Angianthus halophilus, and Goodenia salina.

See also

References

Lakes of the Great Southern (Western Australia)
Saline lakes of Western Australia